Ghislain Marie Raoul Suzanne de Rasilly (born July 9, 1943 Juvardeil, France) is a Catholic prelate and the Bishop Emeritus of Wallis et Futuna since 24 December 2018.

In 2018, he gave in his resignation on Christmas Eve (24 December). Pope Francis then announced that Susitino Sionepoe, former Provincial Vicar of the Society of Mary (Marists) was to succeed him as Bishop of Wallis and Futuna.

References

External links

Diocese of Wallis et Futuna, Wallis and Futuna
Bishop Ghislain Marie Raoul Suzanne de Rasilly, S.M., Catholic-Hierarchy.org
 Announcement of Susitino Sionepoe as successor

1943 births
Living people
21st-century Roman Catholic bishops in Oceania
Wallis and Futuna Roman Catholic bishops
People from Maine-et-Loire
Roman Catholic bishops of Wallis et Futuna